Kaptagat is a human settlement in Uasin Gishu County, in the southwestern part of Kenya. This part of the country, where the two counties of Uasin Gishu and Elgeyo Marakwet County share a border, is used by the majority of Kenyan professional long-distance runners to train for professional competition. Eliud Kipchoge, the marathon world record holder, who also doubles as the Tokyo Olympics and Rio Olympics marathon gold medalist, maintains a training camp in Kaptagat.

Location
Kaptagat is located in Kaptagat Ward, Ainabkoi sub-county, at the eastern edge of Uasin Gishu County.

Athletics training camps
Kaptagat is home to the Great Rift Valley Sports Camp, a training camp for many Kenyan runners including Elijah Lagat, Eliud Kipchoge, Moses Tanui and Brimin Kipruto. Kaptagat is also home to Chepkorio Athletics Club, a club that caters for student athletes. Global Sports Communication's athletics training camp is also located in Kaptagat.

Other considerations
Geoffrey Kipsang Kamworor, a Kenyan professional long-distance runner who competes in cross country, marathon, and half marathon competitions, was born in 1992, in Chepkorio Village, not far from Kaptagat. He undergoes some of his training at Chepkoilel Grounds in Eldoret City.

References

External links
Geographical Location of Kaptagat, Kenya

Populated places in Uasin Gishu County